Michael Jeroen Maarten Michiel de Leeuw (born 7 October 1986) is a Dutch professional footballer who plays as a forward for Eerste Divisie club Willem II.

Career
Born in Goirle, De Leeuw began his career at amateur clubs DWC and RKTVV before joining the youth department of Willem II. He never broke through to the first team, and therefore chose to play for BV Veendam in the Dutch second division.

Veendam
De Leeuw was placed as a striker in his first year for Veendam, and he was an immediate success, scoring 25 goals in 36 league matches. At the end of the year, he won the topscorer award and the award for 'Talent of the Year', for the most talented player of the season. He was chased by several clubs in the Eredivisie and clubs abroad, but in the end chose to stay in Veendam.

Groningen
On 22 May 2012, FC Groningen announced that they had signed De Leeuw. He helped the club win the KNVB Cup in 2014–15 against defending champions PEC Zwolle. It was their first major trophy and they qualified for the UEFA Europa League.

Chicago Fire
On 17 May 2016, the Chicago Fire announced they have signed De Leeuw to a three-year deal through 2018 with a club option for 2019.

In his first season with Chicago, De Leeuw contributed seven goals and three assists across 17 games. In his second season with Chicago, de Leeuw's role switched to supporting striker behind Nemanja Nikolić, who led the league in scoring in 2017. In his new role, De Leeuw contributed a career high eight assists along with three goals. His season was cut short by a ruptured ACL injury suffered against New York City FC on 30 September 2017. De Leeuw was released by Chicago at the end of their 2018 season.

Emmen
On 31 December 2018, De Leeuw signed a one-and-a-half year deal with FC Emmen with an option for an additional year.

Return to Groningen
On 26 March 2021, De Leeuw returned to Groningen when he signed a contract for the 2021–22 season. On 26 October, he scored his first goal back with the team in a 2–0 victory over AZ.

Return to Willem II
On 10 August 2022, de Leeuw returned to his youth club Willem II on a two-year contract.

Career statistics

Honours
Groningen
KNVB Cup: 2014–15

References

External links
 Michael de Leeuw at Voetbal International  – 
 Michael de Leeuw at Chicago Fire Soccer Club

1986 births
Living people
People from Goirle
Association football forwards
Dutch footballers
Eredivisie players
Eerste Divisie players
Major League Soccer players
Willem II (football club) players
FC Groningen players
SC Veendam players
De Graafschap players
FC Emmen players
Chicago Fire FC players
Dutch expatriate footballers
Expatriate soccer players in the United States
Dutch expatriate sportspeople in the United States
Footballers from North Brabant